Abū al-Qāsim Sulaymān ibn Aḥmad ibn Ayyūb ibn Muṭayyir al-Lakhmī al-Shāmī al-Ṭabarānī (Arabic: أبو القاسم سليمان بن أحمد بن أيوب بن مطير اللَّخمي الشامي الطبراني) (AH 260/c. 874 CE - AH 360/971 CE) was a Sunni scholar and jurist known for the extensive volumes of hadith that he published.

Biography
Imam Al Tabarani was born in 260H in Tabariya, ash-Sham. He narrated hadiths from more than one thousand scholars (Muhaditheen). He travelled extensively to many regions to quench his thirst of knowledge which includes Syria, Haramayn Tayyibayn, Yemen, Egypt, Baghdad, Kufa, Basra, Isfahan, etc. He wrote many hadith books (see below). Sayyiduna Abul ‘Abbas Ahmad Bin Mansoor states: I have narrated three hundred thousand Ahadees from Imam Tabarani.  He lived most of the final years of his life in Isfahan, Iran and died there on 27th Dhul-Qa’da, AH 360.

Students
From amongst his students were: Ahmad bin 'Amr bin 'Abdul-Khaliq al-Basri and Abu Bakr al-Bazzar.

Works
He is known primarily for three works on hadith:
 Al-Muʿjam al-Kabīr – from which he excluded the traditions of Abu Hurayra
 Al-Mu'jam al-Awsat – which contains traditions from Abu Hurayra
 Al-Mu'jam as-Saghir – which gave a hadith from each of his masters.

See also
Tabari (name)
Majma al-Zawa'id

References

External links
 Biodata at MuslimScholars.info

870s births
971 deaths
Year of birth uncertain
9th-century Arabs
10th-century Arabs
Sunni Muslim scholars of Islam
Islamic philosophers
Hadith compilers
10th-century Muslim scholars of Islam